The Sunbury railway line is a suburban electric railway in Melbourne, Australia. It has 15 stations, in Myki ticketing Zones 1 and 2. It is the electrified section of the Bendigo railway within metropolitan Melbourne. Prior to the line extension to Sunbury, the line was known as the Sydenham railway line, and prior to the extension of electrification to Sydenham, the line was known as the St Albans railway line.

Description 
The Sunbury line generally traverses flat country and thus has no major earthworks, except on the west bank of the Maribyrnong River where it requires some moderately heavy earthworks. It has eight level crossings and several bridges under or over roads.

Infrastructure 
The line is quadrupled to South Kensington railway station, then is double track for the rest of the line, although from South Kensington to Footscray, it runs alongside the Werribee line, effectively extending the quadruple track to there.

The line is also paralleled by a double track goods line and the interstate standard gauge line, the latter being dual gauge with the goods line to West Footscray. The goods line joins the Sunbury line at Sunshine, whilst the standard gauge line to Sydney continues to run alongside the suburban line to Albion, where it and a goods line head off in a north-easterly direction.

The line also runs alongside the Regional Rail Link to Sunshine, before heading further north.

The line is controlled by automatic block signalling throughout. Intermediate terminating facilities are provided at Sunshine and Watergardens. Stabling facilities are provided at North Melbourne, Watergardens, Calder Park and Sunbury.

Prior to the level crossing removal of the Main Road and Furlong Road level crossings at St. Albans and Ginifer, St Albans had a 3rd platform, as well as stabling yard which could hold 2 six car trains. These were removed as part of the Project.

The Metro Tunnel project will see the Sunbury line joined to the Dandenong line and operated as a single line after completion of the tunnel in 2025.

Services
Usually stops all stations except South Kensington. Some daytime services originate and terminate at Watergardens. Some weekday peak services run express between North Melbourne and Sunshine, stopping at Footscray. Early morning weekend services skip Southern Cross and South Kensington. Weekday morning and weekend services run clockwise, while weekday afternoon services run anticlockwise, through the City Loop. Early morning weekend services run via (but not stopping at) Southern Cross to and from Flinders Street.

Operations 
● All trains stop

◐ Some trains don't stop

History

Origins 

The Melbourne and Murray River Railway had been built out as far as Sunbury by February 1859.

1921–2002: The St Albans line 
Electrification of the line to St Albans was done in October 1921, although electrification occurred to North Melbourne in May 1919 as part of the Essendon electrification and to Footscray in August 1920 as part of the Williamstown electrification.

North Melbourne to South Kensington was quadruplicated in 1924, and South Kensington to Footscray in November 1976.

Automatic block signalling was provided between South Kensington and Footscray (and Yarraville on the Williamstown line) in August 1927, from Footscray to West Footscray in October 1927, North Melbourne to South Kensington in June 1928, Sunshine to Albion in July 1929, West Footscray to Sunshine in October 1929, and Albion to St Albans in February 1930, thus resulting in the entire electrified line being provided with this signalling.

2002–2012: The Sydenham line 
Electrification and automatic block signalling were extended to Sydenham, opening on 27 January 2002: as such the St Albans line was renamed the Sydenham line. A new station was built in northern St Albans, called Keilor Plains, as part of the electrification project as well as a newly revamped station at Sydenham, Watergardens.

In early 2012, the Sydenham line was found to be one of Melbourne's five worst lines for overcrowding.

2012 onwards: The Sunbury line 

On Sunday, 18 November 2012 the electrification of the line to Sunbury became operational; as a result, the Sydenham line was renamed the Sunbury line. Metro's electric train service now continues on from Watergardens station, first to Diggers Rest and then to its new end terminus at Sunbury station, though many services continue to terminate at Watergardens. New passenger services were added on the same date across the whole line and weekly rail services for Sunbury in particular were boosted from 298 to 489.

The $270 million electrification project was first proposed in the 1969 Victorian transport plan, but was opposed by some Sunbury and St Albans residents over concerns of less comfortable travel and added congestion at level crossings on the route as a result of increased services.

Metro Tunnel 

In 2015, work commenced on the Metro Tunnel, a  rail tunnel through the Melbourne CBD between the Sunbury line at South Kensington and the Dandenong corridor at South Yarra. On completion, the Sunbury line will be merged with the Dandenong lines and operate as an end-to-end service through the tunnel.

Work to extend platforms and upgrade traction power, in order to enable the operation of High Capacity Metro Trains on the Sunbury section of the new line, was funded in 2019.

The works will include power and track improvements to trains travelling through the Metro Tunnel, overhead electrification works between Sunbury and South Kensington and at South Yarra, signalling power upgrades and additional infrastructure at Calder Park sidings. The works are being  designed by Aecom and undertaken by CPB Contractors and John Holland Group.

References

External links 

Statistics and detailed schematic map at the VicSig enthusiast website

Railway lines in Melbourne
Railway lines opened in 1859
1859 establishments in Australia
Public transport routes in the City of Melbourne (LGA)
Transport in the City of Maribyrnong
Transport in the City of Brimbank
Transport in the City of Melton